Danielsan may refer to:

 Danielsan Ichiban (born Daniel Elleson, 1975), New Zealand producer/DJ/musician and half of the Australian hip hop duo Koolism
 Karen Danielsan (1885–1952), birth name of German psychoanalyst, Karen Horney

See also
 Denílson (disambiguation)
 Danielson (disambiguation)
 Danielsson (disambiguation)
 Danielsen (disambiguation)
 Donelson (disambiguation)